Babakina festiva is a species of sea slug, an aeolid nudibranch in the family Babakinidae.

References 

Babakinidae
Gastropods described in 1972